On Our Way Up is one of several unauthorized releases of an early Doobie Brothers demo recorded in 1970.  Other unauthorized releases of some or all of the tracks on this recording include Runaround Ways, Introducing The Doobie Brothers, Still Smokin'  and Excitement, among other titles. The covers of the releases commonly show pictures of later Doobie Brothers lineups, including members that don't appear on the recording.

Track listing
"By Yourself" (Pat Simmons) – 2:48
"Make It Easy" (Tom Johnston) – 2:54
"Quicksilver Princess" (Johnston) – 2:18
"Blue Jay" (Johnston) – 4:42
"Coke Can Changes" (Johnston) – 3:24
"Runaround Ways" (Simmons) – 2:45
"Pauper's Diary" (Johnston) – 3:24
"I'll Keep on Givin'" (Johnston) – 3:27
"Excitement" (Johnston) – 4:00
"Song to J.C." (Simmons) – 2:29
"Another Way" (Johnston) – 2:54
"On Our Way Up" (Johnston, Simmons) – 3:39
"Tilted Park Crud Hunchery" (Johnston, Simmons) – 7:57

A later recording of "Blue Jay" (in a modified version) appears on the 1999 box set Long Train Runnin'''.  The melody & chord changes for "I'll Keep On Givin'" were later reworked on "Another Park, Another Sunday" (from What Were Once Vices Are Now Habits'').  None of the remaining songs on this collection appear on any official Doobie Brothers release in any form.  Some CD releases of the demos erroneously swap the titles of "Song to J.C." and "Another Way." "Tilted Park Crud Hunchery" is unique in that it includes a short lead vocal by bassist Dave Shogren.

Personnel
Tom Johnston - guitar, vocals
Pat Simmons - guitar, vocals
Dave Shogren - bass, vocals
John Hartman - drums

The Doobie Brothers albums
2001 albums